

Events

Pre-1600
 617 – Battle of Huoyi: Li Yuan defeats a Sui dynasty army, opening the path to his capture of the imperial capital Chang'an and the eventual establishment of the Tang dynasty.
1100 – Election of Antipope Theodoric.
1198 – Philip of Swabia, Prince of Hohenstaufen, is crowned King of Germany (King of the Romans)
1253 – Pope Innocent IV canonises Stanislaus of Szczepanów, killed by King Bolesław II.
1264 – The Statute of Kalisz, guaranteeing Jews safety and personal liberties and giving battei din jurisdiction over Jewish matters, is promulgated by Bolesław the Pious, Duke of Greater Poland.
1276 – Pope John XXI is elected Pope.
1331 – Stefan Dušan declares himself king of Serbia.
1380 – Battle of Kulikovo: Russian forces defeat a mixed army of Tatars and Mongols, stopping their advance.
1504 – Michelangelo's David is unveiled in Piazza della Signoria in Florence.
1514 – Battle of Orsha: In one of the biggest battles of the century, Lithuanians and Poles defeat the Russian army.
1522 – Magellan–Elcano circumnavigation: Victoria arrives at Seville, technically completing the first circumnavigation.
1565 – St. Augustine, Florida is founded by Spanish admiral and Florida's first governor, Pedro Menéndez de Avilés.

1601–1900
1655 – Warsaw falls without resistance to a small force under the command of Charles X Gustav of Sweden during The Deluge, making it the first time the city is captured by a foreign army.
1727 – A barn fire during a puppet show in the village of Burwell in Cambridgeshire, England kills 78 people, many of whom are children.
1755 – French and Indian War: Battle of Lake George.
1756 – French and Indian War: Kittanning Expedition.
1760 – French and Indian War: French surrender Montreal to the British, completing the latter's conquest of New France.
1761 – Marriage of King George III of the United Kingdom to Duchess Charlotte of Mecklenburg-Strelitz.
1775 – The unsuccessful Rising of the Priests in Malta.
1781 – American Revolutionary War: The Battle of Eutaw Springs in South Carolina, the war's last significant battle in the Southern theater, ends in a narrow British tactical victory.
1793 – French Revolutionary Wars: Battle of Hondschoote.
1796 – French Revolutionary Wars: Battle of Bassano: French forces defeat Austrian troops at Bassano del Grappa.
1810 – The Tonquin sets sail from New York Harbor with 33 employees of John Jacob Astor's newly created Pacific Fur Company on board. After a six-month journey around the tip of South America, the ship arrives at the mouth of the Columbia River and Astor's men establish the fur-trading town of Astoria, Oregon.
1813 – At the final stage of the Peninsular War, British-Portuguese troops capture the town of Donostia (now San Sebastián), resulting in a rampage and eventual destruction of the town.
1831 – William IV and Adelaide of Saxe-Meiningen are crowned King and Queen of the United Kingdom of Great Britain and Ireland.
  1831   – November uprising: The Battle of Warsaw effectively ends the Polish insurrection.
1855 – Crimean War: The French assault the tower of Malakoff, leading to the capture of Sevastopol.
1860 – The steamship  sinks on Lake Michigan, with the loss of around 300 lives.
1862 – Millennium of Russia monument is unveiled in Novgorod.
1863 – American Civil War: In the Second Battle of Sabine Pass, a small Confederate force thwarts a Union invasion of Texas.
1883 – The Northern Pacific Railway (reporting mark NP) was completed in a ceremony at Gold Creek, Montana. Former president Ulysses S. Grant drove in the final "golden spike" in an event attended by rail and political luminaries.
1888 – Isaac Peral's submarine is first tested.
  1888   – The Great Herding begins with thousands of sheep being herded from the Argentine outpost of Fortín Conesa to Santa Cruz near the Strait of Magellan.
  1888   – In London, the body of Jack the Ripper's second murder victim, Annie Chapman, is found.
  1888   – In England, the first six Football League matches are played.
1892 – The Pledge of Allegiance is first recited.
1900 – Galveston hurricane: A powerful hurricane hits Galveston, Texas killing about 8,000 people.

1901–present
1905 – The 7.2  Calabria earthquake shakes southern Italy with a maximum Mercalli intensity of XI (Extreme), killing between 557 and 2,500 people.
1914 – World War I: Private Thomas Highgate becomes the first British soldier to be executed for desertion during the war.
1916 – In a bid to prove that women were capable of serving as military dispatch riders, Augusta and Adeline Van Buren arrive in Los Angeles, completing a 60-day, 5,500 mile cross-country trip on motorcycles.  
1921 – Margaret Gorman, a 16-year-old, wins the Atlantic City Pageant's Golden Mermaid trophy; pageant officials later dubbed her the first Miss America.
1923 – Honda Point disaster: Nine US Navy destroyers run aground off the California coast. Seven are lost, and twenty-three sailors killed.
1925 – Rif War: Spanish forces including troops from the Foreign Legion under Colonel Francisco Franco landing at Al Hoceima, Morocco.
1926 – Germany is admitted to the League of Nations.
1933 – Ghazi bin Faisal became King of Iraq.
1934 – Off the New Jersey coast, a fire aboard the passenger liner  kills 137 people.
1935 – US Senator from Louisiana Huey Long is fatally shot in the Louisiana State Capitol building.
1941 – World War II: German forces begin the Siege of Leningrad.
1943 – World War II: The Armistice of Cassibile is proclaimed by radio. OB Süd immediately implements plans to disarm the Italian forces.
1944 – World War II: London is hit by a V-2 rocket for the first time.
1945 – The division of Korea begins when United States troops arrive to partition the southern part of Korea in response to Soviet troops occupying the northern part of the peninsula a month earlier.
1946 – The referendum abolishes the monarchy in Bulgaria.
1952 – The Canadian Broadcasting Corporation makes its first televised broadcast on the second escape of the Boyd Gang.
1954 – The Southeast Asia Treaty Organization (SEATO) is established.
1960 – In Huntsville, Alabama, US President Dwight D. Eisenhower formally dedicates the Marshall Space Flight Center (NASA had already activated the facility on July 1).
1962 – Last run of the famous Pines Express over the Somerset and Dorset Railway line (UK) fittingly using the last steam locomotive built by British Railways, BR Standard Class 9F 92220 Evening Star.
1966 – The landmark American science fiction television series Star Trek premieres with its first-aired episode, "The Man Trap".
1970 – Trans International Airlines Flight 863 crashes during takeoff from John F. Kennedy International Airport in New York City, killing all 11 aboard.
1971 – In Washington, D.C., the John F. Kennedy Center for the Performing Arts is inaugurated, with the opening feature being the premiere of Leonard Bernstein's Mass.
1973 – World Airways Flight 802 crashes into Mount Dutton in King Cove, Alaska, killing six people.
1974 – Watergate scandal: US President Gerald Ford signs the pardon of Richard Nixon for any crimes Nixon may have committed while in office.
1975 – Gays in the military: US Air Force Tech Sergeant Leonard Matlovich, a decorated veteran of the Vietnam War, appears in his Air Force uniform on the cover of Time magazine with the headline "I Am A Homosexual". He is given a general discharge, later upgraded to honorable.
1978 – Black Friday, a massacre by soldiers against protesters in Tehran, results in 88 deaths, it marks the beginning of the end of the monarchy in Iran.
1986 – Nicholas Daniloff, a correspondent for U.S. News & World Report, is indicted on charges of espionage by the Soviet Union.
1988 – Yellowstone National Park is closed for the first time in U.S. history due to ongoing fires.
1989 – Partnair Flight 394 dives into the North Sea, killing 55 people. The investigation showed that the tail of the plane vibrated loose in flight due to sub-standard connecting bolts that had been fraudulently sold as aircraft-grade.
1994 – USAir Flight 427, on approach to Pittsburgh International Airport, suddenly crashes in clear weather killing all 132 aboard, resulting in the most extensive aviation investigation in world history and altering manufacturing practices in the industry.
2004 – NASA's unmanned spacecraft Genesis crash-lands when its parachute fails to open.
2005 – Two Ilyushin Il-76 aircraft from EMERCOM land at a disaster aid staging area at Little Rock Air Force Base; the first time Russia has flown such a mission to North America.
2016 – NASA launches OSIRIS-REx, its first asteroid sample return mission. The probe will visit 101955 Bennu and is expected to return with samples in 2023.
2017 – Syrian civil war: The Syrian Democratic Forces (SDF) announce the beginning of the Deir ez-Zor campaign, with the stated aim of eliminating the Islamic State (IS) from all areas north and east of the Euphrates.
2022 – Queen Elizabeth II of the United Kingdom dies at Balmoral Castle in Scotland after a reign lasting over 70 years. Her son Charles, Prince of Wales, becomes King of the United Kingdom, assuming the regnal name Charles III.

Births

Pre-1600
 685 – Emperor Xuanzong of Tang (d. 762)
 801 – Ansgar, German archbishop and saint (d. 865)
 828 – Ali al-Hadi, Hijazi (Western Arabian), 10th of the Twelve Imams (d. 868)
1157 – Richard I of England (d. 1199)
1209 – Sancho II of Portugal (d. 1248)
1271 – Charles Martel of Anjou (d. 1295)
1380 – Bernardino of Siena, Italian priest, missionary, and saint (d. 1444)
1413 – Catherine of Bologna, Italian nun and saint (d. 1463)
1442 – John de Vere, 13th Earl of Oxford, English commander and politician, Lord Great Chamberlain of England (d. 1513)
1462 – Henry Medwall, first known English vernacular dramatist (d. 1501)
1474 – Ludovico Ariosto, Italian playwright and poet (d. 1533)
1515 – Alfonso Salmeron, Spanish priest and scholar (d. 1585)
1588 – Marin Mersenne, French mathematician, philosopher, and theologian (d. 1648)
1593 – Toyotomi Hideyori, Japanese nobleman (d. 1615)

1601–1900
1611 – Johann Friedrich Gronovius, German scholar and critic (d. 1671)
1621 – Louis, Grand Condé, French general (d. 1686)
1633 – Ferdinand IV, King of the Romans (d. 1654)
1672 – Nicolas de Grigny, French organist and composer (d. 1703)
1698 – François Francoeur, French violinist and composer (d. 1787)
1742 – Ozias Humphry, English painter and academic (d. 1810)
1749 – Yolande de Polastron, French educator (d. 1793)
1750 – Tanikaze Kajinosuke, Japanese sumo wrestler, the 4th Yokozuna (d. 1795)
1752 – Carl Stenborg, Swedish opera singer, actor, and director (d. 1813)
1767 – August Wilhelm Schlegel, German poet and critic (d. 1845)
1774 – Anne Catherine Emmerich, German nun and mystic (d. 1824)
1779 – Mustafa IV, Ottoman sultan (d. 1808)
1783 – N. F. S. Grundtvig, Danish pastor, philosopher, and author (d. 1872)
1804 – Eduard Mörike, German pastor, poet, and academic (d. 1875)
1814 – Charles Étienne Brasseur de Bourbourg, French archaeologist, ethnographer, and historian (d. 1874)
1815 – Giuseppina Strepponi, Italian soprano and educator (d. 1897)
1822 – Karl von Ditmar, German geologist and explorer (d. 1892)
1824 – Jaime Nunó, Spanish-American composer, conductor, and director (d. 1908)
1828 – Joshua Chamberlain, American general and politician, 32nd Governor of Maine (d. 1914)
  1828   – Clarence Cook, American author and critic (d. 1900)
1830 – Frédéric Mistral, French poet and lexicographer, Nobel Prize laureate (d. 1914)
1831 – Wilhelm Raabe, German author and painter (d. 1910)
1841 – Antonín Dvořák, Czech composer and academic (d. 1904)
1846 – Paul Chater, Indian-Hong Kong businessman and politician (d. 1926)
1851 – John Jenkins, American-Australian businessman and politician, 22nd Premier of South Australia (d. 1923)
1852 – Gojong of Korea (d. 1919)
1857 – Georg Michaelis, German academic and politician, 6th Chancellor of Germany (d. 1936)
1863 – Mary of the Divine Heart, German nun and saint (d. 1899)
1863 – W.W. Jacobs, English novelist and short story writer (d. 1943)
1867 – Alexander Parvus, Belarusian-German theoretician and activist (d. 1924)
1868 – Seth Weeks, American mandolin player, composer, and bandleader (d. 1953)
1869 – José María Pino Suárez, Mexican politician, Vice President of Mexico, murdered in a military coup (d. 1913)
1871 – Samuel McLaughlin, Canadian businessman and philanthropist, founded the McLaughlin Carriage Company (d. 1972)
1872 – James William McCarthy, American judge (d. 1939)
1873 – Alfred Jarry, French author and playwright (d. 1907)
  1873   – David O. McKay, American religious leader, 9th President of The Church of Jesus Christ of Latter-day Saints (d. 1970)
1876 – Inez Knight Allen, Mormon missionary and Utah politician (d. 1937)
1881 – Harry Hillman, American runner and hurdler (d. 1945)
  1881   – Refik Saydam, Turkish physician and politician, 5th Prime Minister of Turkey (d. 1942)
1884 – Théodore Pilette, Belgian race car driver (d. 1921)
1886 – Siegfried Sassoon, English captain, journalist, and poet (d. 1967)
  1886   – Ninon Vallin, French soprano and actress (d. 1961)
1889 – Robert A. Taft, American lawyer and politician (d. 1953)
1894 – John Samuel Bourque, Canadian soldier and politician (d. 1974)
  1894   – Willem Pijper, Dutch composer and critic (d. 1947)
1896 – Howard Dietz, American publicist and songwriter (d. 1983)
1897 – Jimmie Rodgers, American singer-songwriter and guitarist (d. 1933)
1900 – Tilly Devine, English-Australian organised crime boss (d. 1970)
  1900   – Claude Pepper, American lawyer and politician (d. 1989)

1901–present
1901 – Hendrik Verwoerd, Dutch-South African journalist and politician, 7th Prime Minister of South Africa (d. 1966)
1903 – Jane Arbor, English author (d. 1994)
1906 – Andrei Kirilenko, Russian engineer and politician (d. 1990)
1907 – William Wentworth, Australian economist and politician, 11th Australian Minister for Human Services (d. 2003)
1909 – Józef Noji, Polish runner (d. 1943)
1910 – Jean-Louis Barrault, French actor and director (d. 1994)
1914 – Patriarch Demetrios I of Constantinople (d. 1991)
  1914   – Denys Lasdun, English architect, designed the Royal National Theatre (d. 2001)
1915 – N. V. M. Gonzalez, Filipino novelist, poet, and writer (d. 1999)
1917 – Jan Sedivka, Czech-Australian violinist and educator (d. 2009)
1918 – Derek Barton, English-American chemist and academic, Nobel Prize laureate (d. 1998)
1919 – Gianni Brera, Italian journalist and author (d. 1992)
  1919   – Maria Lassnig, Austrian painter and academic (d. 2014)
1921 – Harry Secombe, Welsh-English actor (d. 2001)
  1921   – Dinko Šakić, Croatian concentration camp commander (d. 2008)
1922 – Sid Caesar, American comic actor and writer (d. 2014)
  1922   – Lyndon LaRouche, American politician and activist, founded the LaRouche movement (d. 2019)
1923 – Rasul Gamzatov, Russian poet (d. 2003)
  1923   – Wilbur Ware, American double-bassist (d. 1979)
1924 – Wendell H. Ford, American politician, 53rd Governor of Kentucky (d. 2015)
  1924   – Marie-Claire Kirkland, American-Canadian lawyer, judge, and politician (d. 2016)
  1924   – Grace Metalious, American author (d. 1964)
  1924   – Mimi Parent, Canadian-Swiss painter (d. 2005)
1925 – Jacqueline Ceballos, American activist, founded the Veteran Feminists of America
  1925   – Peter Sellers, English actor and comedian (d. 1980)
1926 – Bhupen Hazarika, Indian singer-songwriter, poet, and director (d. 2011)
1927 – Harlan Howard, American songwriter (d. 2002)
  1927   – Robert L. Rock, American politician, 42nd Lieutenant Governor of Indiana (d. 2013)
  1927   – Marguerite Frank, American-French mathematician
1929 – Christoph von Dohnányi, German conductor
1930 – Nguyễn Cao Kỳ, Vietnamese general and politician, 16th Prime Minister of the Republic of Vietnam (d. 2011)
1931 – Marion Brown, American saxophonist and composer (d. 2010)
  1931   – John Garrett, English politician (d. 2007)
1932 – Patsy Cline, American singer-songwriter and pianist (d. 1963)
1933 – Asha Bhosle, Indian singer 
  1933   – Michael Frayn, English author and playwright
  1933   – Jeffrey Koo Sr., Taiwanese banker and businessman (d. 2012)
  1933   – Eric Salzman, American composer, producer, and critic (d. 2017)
  1933   – Maigonis Valdmanis, Latvian basketball player and coach (d. 1999)
1934 – Rodrigue Biron, Canadian politician
  1934   – Ross Brown, New Zealand rugby player (d. 2014)
  1934   – Peter Maxwell Davies, English composer and conductor (d. 2016)
  1934   – Bernard Donoughue, Baron Donoughue, English academic and politician
1936 – Roy Newman, English admiral
1937 – Edna Adan Ismail, Somaliland politician and activist
  1937   – Barbara Frum, American-Canadian journalist (d. 1992)
  1937   – Archie Goodwin, American author and illustrator (d. 1998)
1938 – Adrian Cronauer, American sergeant and radio host (d. 2018)
  1938   – Kenichi Horie, Japanese sailor
  1938   – Sam Nunn, American lawyer and politician
1939 – Carsten Keller, German field hockey player and coach
  1939   – Guitar Shorty, American singer and guitarist
1940 – Quentin L. Cook, American religious leader
  1940   – Jerzy Robert Nowak, Polish historian and journalist
  1940   – Jack Prelutsky, American author and poet
1941 – Bernie Sanders, American politician
1942 – Brian Cole, American bass player (d. 1972)
  1942   – Judith Hann, English journalist and author
  1942   – Sal Valentino, American rock singer-songwriter and guitarist
1943 – Adelaide C. Eckardt, American academic and politician
1944 – Peter Bellamy, English singer-songwriter (d. 1991)
  1944   – Margaret Hodge, English economist and politician
  1944   – Terry Jenner, Australian cricketer and coach (d. 2011)
1945 – Lem Barney, American football player
  1945   – Kelly Groucutt, English bass player (d. 2009)
  1945   – Ron "Pigpen" McKernan, American singer-songwriter and keyboard player (d. 1973)
  1945   – Vinko Puljić, Croatian cardinal
  1945   – Rogie Vachon, Canadian ice hockey player and coach
1946 – L. C. Greenwood, American football player (d. 2013)
  1946   – Aziz Sancar, Turkish-American biologist and academic, Nobel Prize laureate
  1946   – Wong Kan Seng, Singaporean business executive, former Deputy Prime Minister of Singapore
1947 – Valery Afanassiev, Russian pianist and conductor
  1947   – Halldór Ásgrímsson, Icelandic accountant and politician, 22nd Prime Minister of Iceland (d. 2015)
  1947   – Ann Beattie, American novelist and short story writer
  1947   – Benjamin Orr, American singer-songwriter and bass player (d. 2000)
  1947   – Marianne Wiggins, American author
1948 – Great Kabuki, Japanese wrestler
  1948   – Jean-Pierre Monseré, Belgian cyclist (d. 1971)
1949 – Edward Hinds, English physicist and academic
1950 – Ian Davidson, Scottish lawyer and politician
  1950   – Zachary Richard, American singer-songwriter and poet
  1950   – Mike Simpson, American dentist and politician
1951 – Tim Gullikson, American tennis player and coach (d. 1996)
  1951   – Tom Gullikson, American tennis player and coach
  1951   – John McDonnell, English politician
  1951   – Dezső Ránki, Hungarian pianist
1952 – Will Lee, American bass player
  1952   – Geoff Miller, English cricketer
  1952   – Graham Mourie, New Zealand rugby player
1953 – Pascal Greggory, French actor
  1953   – Stein-Erik Olsen, Norwegian guitarist
1954 – Mark Lindsay Chapman, English actor
  1954   – Ruby Bridges, American civil rights activist
  1954   – Michael Shermer, American historian, author, and academic, founded The Skeptics Society
1955 – David O'Halloran, Australian footballer (d. 2013)
  1955   – Terry Tempest Williams, American environmentalist and author
1956 – Mick Brown, American drummer
  1956   – David Carr, American journalist and author (d. 2015)
  1956   – Maurice Cheeks, American basketball player and coach
  1956   – Stefan Johansson, Swedish race car driver
1957 – Walt Easley, American football player (d. 2013)
1958 – Bart Batten, American wrestler
  1958   – Brad Batten, American wrestler (d. 2014)
1958 – Michael Lardie, American keyboard player, songwriter, and producer
1960 – Aimee Mann, American singer-songwriter, guitarist, and actress
  1960   – David Steele, English bass player and songwriter
  1960   – Aguri Suzuki, Japanese race car driver
1961 – Timothy Well, American wrestler (d. 2017)
1963 – Alexandros Alexiou, Greek footballer
  1963   – Daniel Wolpert, American scientist
1964 – Michael Johns, American businessman and political activist
  1964   – Joachim Nielsen, Norwegian singer-songwriter and guitarist (d. 2000)
  1964   – Raven, American wrestler
1965 – Darlene Zschech, Australian singer-songwriter and pastor
  1965   – Tutilo Burger, German Benedictine monk and abbot
1966 – Peter Furler, Australian singer-songwriter, guitarist, and producer
1967 – Eerik-Niiles Kross, Estonian politician and diplomat
  1967   – James Packer, Australian businessman
  1967   – Kimberly Peirce, American director, producer, and screenwriter
1968 – Wolfram Klein, German footballer
  1968   – Ray Wilson, Scottish singer-songwriter and guitarist
1969 – Lars Bohinen, Norwegian footballer and manager
  1969   – Oswaldo Ibarra, Ecuadorian footballer
  1969   – Chris Powell, English footballer and manager
  1969   – Gary Speed, Welsh footballer and manager (d. 2011)
1970 – Neko Case, American singer-songwriter and guitarist
  1970   – Paul DiPietro, Canadian-Swiss ice hockey player
  1970   – Nidal Hasan, American soldier, psychiatrist, and mass murderer
  1970   – Latrell Sprewell, American basketball player
  1970   – Lodi, American wrestler
  1970   – Andy Ward, Irish rugby player and coach
  1970   – John Welborn, Australian rugby player
1971 – David Arquette, American actor, director, producer, screenwriter, and wrestler
  1971   – Martin Freeman, English actor
  1971   – Lachlan Murdoch, English-Australian businessman
  1971   – Dustin O'Halloran, American pianist and composer
  1971   – Daniel Petrov, Bulgarian boxer
  1971   – Pierre Sévigny, Canadian ice hockey player and coach
1972 – Markus Babbel, German footballer and manager
  1972   – Os du Randt, South African rugby player and coach
  1972   – Lisa Kennedy Montgomery, American radio and television host
1973 – Khamis Al-Dosari, Saudi Arabian footballer (d. 2020)
  1973   – Gabrial McNair, American saxophonist, keyboard player, and composer
  1973   – Troy Sanders, American singer-songwriter and bass player
  1973   – Matteo Strukul, Italian writer and journalist
1974 – Marios Agathokleous, Cypriot footballer
  1974   – Tanaz Eshaghian, Iranian-American director and producer
  1974   – Braulio Luna, Mexican footballer
  1974   – Rick Michaels, American wrestler
1975 – Lee Eul-yong, South Korean footballer and manager
  1975   – Richard Hughes, English drummer
  1975   – Chris Latham, Australian rugby player
  1975   – Elena Likhovtseva, Russian tennis player
  1975   – Larenz Tate, American actor, director, and producer
1976 – Gerald Drummond, Costa Rican footballer
  1976   – Jervis Drummond, Costa Rican footballer
  1976   – Sjeng Schalken, Dutch tennis player
  1977   – Jay McKee, Canadian ice hockey player and coach
1978 – Gerard Autet, Spanish footballer and manager
  1978   – Emanuele Ferraro, Italian footballer
  1978   – Gil Meche, American baseball player
  1978   – Angela Rawlings, Canadian-American author and poet
  1978   – Rebel, American wrestler
1979 – Pink, American singer-songwriter, producer, and actress
1981 – Kate Abdo, English journalist
  1981   – Selim Benachour, Tunisian footballer
  1981   – Māris Ļaksa, Latvian basketball player
  1981   – Morten Gamst Pedersen, Norwegian footballer
  1981   – Jonathan Taylor Thomas, American actor
1982 – Travis Daniels, American football player
1983 – Kate Beaton, Canadian cartoonist
  1983   – Diego Benaglio, Swiss footballer
  1983   – Will Blalock, American basketball player
  1983   – Chris Judd, Australian footballer
  1983   – Wali Lundy, American football player
  1983   – Lewis Roberts-Thomson, Australian footballer
  1983   – Sarah Stup, American writer and autism activist
1984 – Bobby Parnell, American baseball player
  1984   – Vitaly Petrov, Russian race car driver
  1984   – Jürgen Säumel, Austrian footballer
  1984   – Tiago Treichel, Brazilian footballer
  1984   – Peter Whittingham, English footballer (d. 2020)
1985 – Tomasz Jodłowiec, Polish footballer
1986 – Brett Anderson, Australian rugby league player
  1986   – Carlos Bacca, Colombian footballer
  1986   – Matt Grothe, American football player
  1986   – Dan Hunt, Australian rugby league player
  1986   – João Moutinho, Portuguese footballer
  1986   – Kirill Nababkin, Russian footballer
1987 – Alexandre Bilodeau, Canadian skier
  1987   – Danielle Frenkel, Israeli high jumper
  1987   – Wiz Khalifa, Haitian rapper and actor
  1987   – Illya Marchenko, Ukrainian tennis player
  1987   – Marcel Nguyen, German gymnast
1988 – Arrelious Benn, American football player
  1988   – Rie Kaneto, Japanese swimmer
1989 – Gylfi Sigurðsson, Icelandic footballer
  1989   – Avicii, Swedish electronic musician (d. 2018)
1990 – Matt Barkley, American football player
  1990   – Tokelo Rantie, South African footballer
  1990   – Musa Nizam, Turkish footballer
1990 – Jos Buttler, English cricketer
1991 – Ignacio González, Mexican footballer
  1991   – Joe Sugg, British vlogger
1992 – Nino Niederreiter, Swiss ice hockey player
  1992   – Kilian Pruschke, German footballer
1993 – Will Bosisto, Australian cricketer
  1993   – Yoshikazu Fujita, Japanese rugby union player
1994 – Marco Benassi, Italian footballer
  1994   – Cameron Dallas, American internet personality
  1994   – Bruno Fernandes, Portuguese footballer
  1994   – Ćamila Mičijević, Croatian-Bosnian handball player
1995 – Ellie Black, Canadian gymnast
1997 – Lars Nootbaar, American baseball player 
1998 – Matheus Leist, Brazilian race car driver
2000 – Miles McBride, American basketball player
2002 – Gaten Matarazzo, American actor and singer

Deaths

Pre-1600
 394 – Arbogast, Frankish general
 701 – Pope Sergius I (b. 650)
 780 – Leo IV the Khazar, Byzantine emperor (b. 750)
 869 – Ahmad ibn Isra'il al-Anbari, Muslim vizier
1100 – Antipope Clement III (b. 1029)
1306 – Sir Simon Fraser, Scottish knight, hung drawn and quartered by the English
1397 – Thomas of Woodstock, 1st Duke of Gloucester, English politician, Lord High Constable of England (b. 1355)
1425 – Charles III of Navarre (b. 1361)
1539 – John Stokesley, English bishop (b. 1475)
1555 – Saint Thomas of Villanueva, Spanish bishop and saint(b. 1488)
1560 – Amy Robsart, English noblewoman (b. 1536)

1601–1900
1613 – Carlo Gesualdo, Italian lute player and composer (b. 1566)
1637 – Robert Fludd, English physician, mathematician, and cosmologist (b. 1574)
1644 – John Coke, English civil servant and politician (b. 1563)
  1644   – Francis Quarles, English poet and author (b. 1592)
1645 – Francisco de Quevedo, Spanish poet and politician (b. 1580)
1656 – Joseph Hall, English bishop (b. 1574)
1682 – Juan Caramuel y Lobkowitz, Spanish mathematician and philosopher (b. 1606)
1721 – Michael Brokoff, Czech sculptor (b. 1686)
1755 – Ephraim Williams, American soldier and philanthropist (b. 1715)
1761 – Bernard Forest de Bélidor, French mathematician and engineer (b. 1698)
1780 – Enoch Poor, American general (b. 1736)
1784 – Ann Lee, English-American religious leader (b. 1736)
1811 – Peter Simon Pallas, German zoologist and botanist (b. 1741)
1831 – John Aitken, Scottish-American publisher (b. 1745)
1853 – Frédéric Ozanam, French scholar, co-founded the Society of Saint Vincent de Paul (b. 1813)
1873 – Johan Gabriel Ståhlberg, Finnish priest and father of K. J. Ståhlberg, the first President of Finland (b. 1832)
1882 – Joseph Liouville, French mathematician and academic (b. 1809)
1916 – Friedrich Baumfelder, German pianist, composer, and conductor (b. 1836)
1894 – Hermann von Helmholtz, German physician and physicist (b. 1821)

1901–present
1909 – Vere St. Leger Goold, Irish tennis player (b. 1853)
1933 – Faisal I of Iraq (b. 1883)
1935 – Carl Weiss, American physician (b. 1906)
1940 – Hemmo Kallio, Finnish actor (b. 1863)
1942 – Rıza Nur, Turkish surgeon and politician (b. 1879)
1943 – Julius Fučík, Czech journalist (b. 1903)
1944 – Jan van Gilse, Dutch composer and conductor (b. 1881)
1949 – Richard Strauss, German composer and manager (b. 1864)
1954 – André Derain, French painter and sculptor (b. 1880)
1963 – Maurice Wilks, English engineer and businessman (d. 1904)
1965 – Dorothy Dandridge, American actress and singer (b. 1922)
  1965   – Hermann Staudinger, German chemist and academic, Nobel Prize laureate (b. 1881)
1969 – Bud Collyer, American game show host (b. 1908)
  1969   – Alexandra David-Néel, Belgian-French explorer and activist (b. 1868)
1970 – Percy Spencer, American engineer, invented the microwave oven (b. 1894)
1974 – Wolfgang Windgassen, French-German tenor (b. 1914)
1977 – Zero Mostel, American actor and comedian (b. 1915)
1980 – Willard Libby, American chemist and academic, Nobel Prize laureate (b. 1908)
1981 – Nisargadatta Maharaj, Indian guru, philosopher, and educator (b. 1897)
  1981   – Roy Wilkins, American journalist and activist (b. 1901)
  1981   – Hideki Yukawa, Japanese physicist and academic, Nobel Prize laureate (b. 1907)
1983 – Antonin Magne, French cyclist (b. 1904)
1985 – John Franklin Enders, American virologist and academic, Nobel Prize laureate (b. 1887)
1990 – Denys Watkins-Pitchford, English author and illustrator (b. 1905)
1991 – Alex North, American composer and conductor (b. 1910)
  1991   – Brad Davis, American actor (b. 1949)
1997 – Derek Taylor, English journalist and author (b. 1932)
1999 – Moondog, American-German singer-songwriter, drummer, and poet (b. 1916)
2001 – Bill Ricker, Canadian entomologist and author (b. 1908)
2002 – Laurie Williams, Jamaican cricketer (b. 1968)
2003 – Leni Riefenstahl, German actress, director, producer, and screenwriter (b. 1902)
2004 – Frank Thomas, American animator, voice actor, and screenwriter (b. 1913)
2005 – Noel Cantwell, Irish cricketer, footballer, and manager (b. 1932)
  2005   – Donald Horne, Australian journalist, author, and critic (b. 1921)
2006 – Hilda Bernstein, English-South African author and activist (b. 1915)
  2006   – Peter Brock, Australian race car driver and sportscaster (b. 1945)
2007 – Vincent Serventy, Australian ornithologist, conservationist, and author (b. 1916)
2008 – Ralph Plaisted, American explorer (b. 1927)
2009 – Aage Bohr, Danish physicist and academic, Nobel Prize laureate (b. 1922)
  2009   – Mike Bongiorno, American-Italian television host (b. 1924)
2012 – Ronald Hamowy, Canadian historian and academic (b. 1937)
  2012   – Bill Moggridge, English-American designer, author, and educator, co-founded IDEO (b. 1943)
  2012   – Thomas Szasz, Hungarian-American psychiatrist and academic (b. 1920)
2013 – Goose Gonsoulin, American football player (b. 1938)
  2013   – Don Reichert, Canadian painter and photographer (b. 1932)
  2013   – Jean Véronis, French linguist, computer scientist, and blogger (b. 1955)
2014 – Marvin Barnes, American basketball player (b. 1952)
  2014   – S. Truett Cathy, American businessman, founded Chick-fil-A (b. 1921)
  2014   – Sean O'Haire, American wrestler, mixed martial artist, and kick-boxer (b. 1971)
  2014   – Magda Olivero, Italian soprano (b. 1910)
  2014   – Gerald Wilson, American trumpet player and composer (b. 1918)
  2014   – George Zuverink, American baseball player (b. 1924)
2015 – Joaquín Andújar, Dominican baseball player (b. 1952)
  2015   – Andrew Kohut, American political scientist and academic (b. 1942)
  2015   – Tyler Sash, American football player (b. 1988)
  2015   – Joost Zwagerman, Dutch author and poet (b. 1963)
2016 – Hannes Arch, Austrian race pilot (b. 1967)
  2016   – Dragiša Pešić, Montenegrin politician, 5th Prime Minister of the Federal Republic of Yugoslavia (b. 1954)
  2016   – Prince Buster, Jamaican singer-songwriter and producer (b. 1938)
2017 – Pierre Bergé, French businessman (b. 1930)
  2017   – Blake Heron, American actor (b. 1982)
  2017   – Jerry Pournelle, American author and journalist (b. 1933)
  2017   – Ljubiša Samardžić, Serbian actor and director (b. 1936)
  2017   – Don Williams, American musician (b. 1939)
2018 – Gennadi Gagulia, Prime Minister of Abkhazia (b. 1948)
  2018   – Chelsi Smith, American singer and beauty pageant winner (b. 1973)
2022 – Elizabeth II, Queen of the United Kingdom and other Commonwealth realms (b. 1926)
  2022   – Gwyneth Powell, English actress (b. 1946)

Holidays and observances
Christian Feast Day:
Adrian and Natalia of Nicomedia (Roman Catholic Church)
Corbinian
Disibod
Nativity of Mary (Roman Catholic Church), (Anglo-Catholicism)
Monti Fest (Mangalorean Catholic)
Our Lady of Charity
 Our Lady of Covadonga
Our Lady of Good Health of Vailankanni
Pope Sergius I
September 8 (Eastern Orthodox liturgics)
Feast Day of Our Lady of Meritxell (national holiday in Andorra)
Independence Day, celebrates the independence of Macedonia from Yugoslavia in 1991.
International Literacy Day (International)
Martyrs' Day (Afghanistan) (date may fall on September 9, follows a non-Gregorian calendar)
National Day, also the feast of Our Lady of Meritxell (Andorra)
Victory Day (Pakistan)
Victory Day, also the feast of Our Lady of Victories or il-Vittorja (Malta)
World Physical Therapy Day

References

External links

 
 
 

Days of the year
September